The 2022–23 Rain or Shine Elasto Painters season was the 16th season of the franchise in the Philippine Basketball Association (PBA).

Key dates
May 15: The PBA Season 47 draft was held at the Robinsons Place Manila in Manila.

Draft picks

Roster

  also serves as Rain or Shine's board governor.

Philippine Cup

Eliminations

Standings

Game log

|-bgcolor=ccffcc
| 1
| June 5
| Converge
| W 79–77
| Leonard Santillan (18)
| Norbert Torres (10)
| Gabe Norwood (5)
| Smart Araneta Coliseum8,241
| 1–0
|-bgcolor=ffcccc
| 2
| June 9
| NorthPort
| L 81–94
| Mike Nieto (19)
| Nick Demusis (8)
| Mike Nieto (4)
| Ynares Center
| 1–1
|-bgcolor=ffcccc
| 3
| June 15
| Barangay Ginebra
| L 85–90
| Mike Nieto (15)
| Belga, Demusis (10)
| Beau Belga (7)
| SM Mall of Asia Arena
| 1–2
|-bgcolor=ffcccc
| 4
| June 19
| Phoenix
| L 102–106
| Rey Nambatac (27)
| Nick Demusis (8)
| Beau Belga (6)
| SM Mall of Asia Arena
| 1–3
|-bgcolor=ffcccc
| 5
| June 23
| TNT
| L 85–89 (OT)
| Mike Nieto (19)
| Belga, Santillan (10)
| Beau Belga (7)
| Ynares Center
| 1–4
|-bgcolor=ffcccc
| 6
| June 29
| San Miguel
| L 93–99
| Jewel Ponferada (20)
| Andrei Caracut (7)
| Andrei Caracut (7)
| Smart Araneta Coliseum
| 1–5

|-bgcolor=ffcccc
| 7
| July 6
| Meralco
| L 73–77
| Gabe Norwood (13)
| Gabe Norwood (9)
| Belga, Borboran, Norwood (3)
| Smart Araneta Coliseum
| 1–6
|-bgcolor=ccffcc
| 8
| July 9
| NLEX
| W 96–86
| Leonard Santillan (18)
| Mike Nieto (7)
| Belga, Norwood (4)
| Smart Araneta Coliseum
| 2–6
|-bgcolor=ccffcc
| 9
| July 13
| Blackwater
| W 107–90
| Rey Nambatac (26)
| Gabe Norwood (8)
| Rey Nambatac (4)
| Smart Araneta Coliseum
| 3–6
|-bgcolor=ccffcc
| 10
| July 16
| Terrafirma
| W 97–82
| Asistio, Caracut (14)
| Rey Nambatac (10)
| Rey Nambatac (9)
| SM Mall of Asia Arena
| 4–6
|-bgcolor=ffcccc
| 11
| July 20
| Magnolia
| L 87–118
| Leonard Santillan (17)
| Leonard Santillan (8)
| Andrei Caracut (10)
| Smart Araneta Coliseum
| 4–7

Commissioner's Cup

Eliminations

Standings

Game log

|-bgcolor=ffcccc
| 1
| September 23, 2022
| NLEX
| L 90–96
| Steve Taylor Jr. (21)
| Beau Belga (14)
| Andrei Caracut (5)
| PhilSports Arena
| 0–1
|-bgcolor=ccffcc
| 2
| September 28, 2022
| Barangay Ginebra
| W 93–71
| Steve Taylor Jr. (21)
| Steve Taylor Jr. (10)
| Rey Nambatac (9)
| SM Mall of Asia Arena
| 1–1

|-bgcolor=ccffcc
| 3
| October 2, 2022
| Terrafirma
| W 106–94
| Steve Taylor Jr. (20)
| Steve Taylor Jr. (24)
| Mike Nieto (5)
| Smart Araneta Coliseum
| 2–1
|-bgcolor=ffcccc
| 4
| October 9, 2022
| San Miguel
| L 105–113
| Steve Taylor Jr. (20)
| Steve Taylor Jr. (18)
| Steve Taylor Jr. (9)
| PhilSports Arena
| 2–2
|-bgcolor=ffcccc
| 5
| October 15, 2022
| TNT
| L 91–110
| Rey Nambatac (20)
| Leonard Santillan (10)
| Asistio, Nambatac (4)
| Smart Araneta Coliseum
| 2–3
|-bgcolor=ccffcc
| 6
| October 22, 2022
| Meralco
| W 113–96
| Steve Taylor Jr. (22)
| Steve Taylor Jr. (15)
| Rey Nambatac (9)
| PhilSports Arena
| 3–3
|-bgcolor=ffcccc
| 7
| October 26, 2022
| Phoenix
| L 83–92
| Steve Taylor Jr. (16)
| Steve Taylor Jr. (19)
| Gian Mamuyac (6)
| Ynares Center
| 3–4

|-bgcolor=ccffcc
| 8
| November 4, 2022
| NorthPort
| W 76–75
| Steve Taylor Jr. (20)
| Steve Taylor Jr. (16)
| Rey Nambatac (4)
| Smart Araneta Coliseum
| 4–4
|-bgcolor=ffcccc
| 9
| November 11, 2022
| Bay Area
| L 87–120
| Anton Asistio (20)
| Mike Nieto (7)
| Anton Asistio (4)
| Ynares Center
| 4–5
|-bgcolor=ffcccc
| 10
| November 13, 2022
| Converge
| L 101–102
| Ryan Pearson (25)
| Ryan Pearson (10)
| Gabe Norwood (7)
| Smart Araneta Coliseum
| 4–6
|-bgcolor=ccffcc
| 11
| November 25, 2022
| Blackwater
| W 116–97
| Ryan Pearson (22)
| Ryan Pearson (12)
| Anton Asistio (6)
| PhilSports Arena
| 5–6

|-bgcolor=ffcccc
| 12
| December 2, 2022
| Magnolia
| L 90–106
| Nambatac, Santillan (15)
| Leonard Santillan (12)
| Gian Mamuyac (5)
| PhilSports Arena
| 5–7

Playoffs

Bracket

Game log

|-bgcolor=ccffcc
| 1
| December 4, 2022
| NLEX
| W 110–100
| Ryan Pearson (24)
| Ryan Pearson (9)
| Caracut, Mamuyac, Norwood, Pearson (3)
| PhilSports Arena
| 1–0

|-bgcolor=ffcccc
| 1
| December 9, 2022
| Bay Area
| L 96–126
| Rey Nambatac (19)
| Mamuyac, Nieto, Pearson (5)
| Andrei Caracut (11)
| PhilSports Arena
| 0–1

Governors' Cup

Eliminations

Standings

Game log

|-bgcolor=ffcccc
| 1
| January 22
| Meralco
| L 87–105
| Rey Nambatac (21)
| Michael Qualls (15)
| Michael Qualls (5)
| PhilSports Arena
| 0–1
|-bgcolor=ffcccc
| 2
| January 27
| TNT
| L 100–105
| Michael Qualls (35)
| Michael Qualls (17)
| Norwood, Qualls (5)
| Ynares Center
| 0–2

|-bgcolor=ffcccc
| 3
| February 2
| Converge
| L 98–112 
| Michael Qualls (34)
| Michael Qualls (9)
| Rey Nambatac (6)
| PhilSports Arena
| 0–3
|-bgcolor=ffcccc
| 4
| February 5
| Barangay Ginebra
| L 108–116 
| Michael Qualls (23)
| Beau Belga (6)
| Nambatac, Norwood (4)
| Smart Araneta Coliseum10,080
| 0–4
|-bgcolor=ccffcc
| 5
| February 12
| Blackwater
| W 122–117
| Greg Smith II (38)
| Belga, Norwood, Santillan (7)
| Anton Asistio (6)
| SM Mall of Asia Arena11,212
| 1–4
|-bgcolor=ccffcc
| 6
| February 16
| Terrafirma
| W 120–118 
| Andrei Caracut (25)
| Belga, Santillan (6)
| Beau Belga (8)
| Smart Araneta Coliseum
| 2–4
|-bgcolor=ffcccc
| 7
| February 22
| Magnolia
| L 97–112  
| Greg Smith II (15)
| Leonard Santillan (7)
| Andrei Caracut (6)
| PhilSports Arena
| 2–5
|-bgcolor=ffcccc
| 8
| February 25
| NLEX
| L 99–110  
| Rey Nambatac (26)
| Gabe Norwood (8)
| Beau Belga (6)
| Smart Araneta Coliseum
| 2–6

|-bgcolor=ffcccc
| 9
| March 1
| Phoenix
| L 106–114 
| Santillan, Torres (14)
| Nick Demusis (11)
| Rey Nambatac (7)
| Smart Araneta Coliseum
| 2–7
|-bgcolor=ffcccc
| 10
| March 4
| NorthPort
| L 97–113 
| Leonard Santillan (17)
| Beau Belga (8)
| Beau Belga (4)
| PhilSports Arena
| 2–8
|- align="center"
|colspan="9" bgcolor="#bbcaff"|All-Star Break
|-bgcolor=ffcccc
| 11
| March 17
| San Miguel
| L 116–129 
| Gian Mamuyac (23)
| Gian Mamuyac (10)
| Andrei Caracut (7)
| PhilSports Arena
| 2–9

Transactions

Free agency

Signings

Trades

Philippine Cup

Recruited imports

References

Rain or Shine Elasto Painters seasons
Rain or Shine Elasto Painters